Probonas or Promponas is a northerly neighborhood of Athens, Greece.

Probonas is the northernmost neighborhood of the municipality of Athens, located on its north-west angle. It borders Ano Patissia to the south, Nea Chalkidona to the west, Perissos to the north and Rizoupoli, along with the ISAP railway line to the east. On the west of Promponas, runs the torrent of Podoniftis, which is the "border" between the municipality of Athens and the one of Nea Filadelfeia-Chalkidona.

Its name derives from Dimitrios Probonas (1874–1949), MP and doctor.

Transport
Ano Patisia metro station and Perissos metro station on Line 1 of the Athens Metro serve the area. There are bus lines passing from its south part on Chalkidos Street. The other main streets of the neighborhood are Antheon and Probona.

Landmarks

 Probona Park (alsos)
 Podoniftis torrent
 Athens' central flower market, Antheon St. 21-23 / Probona St. 26
 Two of the first tall buildings of Athens are situated in the area, constructed in the '70s (18-storey and 15-storey high), Tirinthos St. & Amipsiou St.

References

Neighbourhoods in Athens